Michael Thalheimer (born 28 May 1965) is a German theatre director.

Life 
Born in Münster, Thalheimer studied from 1985 to 1989 at the Bern School of Acting, now integrated into the University of the Arts Bern. As an actor, he was engaged at many German-speaking theatres, including in Bern, Mainz, Bremerhaven and Chemnitz. 

In 1997, he presented his first production at the Theater Chemnitz: Fernando Arrabal's The Architect and the Emperor of Assyria. Since his work at the theatre in Chemnitz, he has worked with the set designer Olaf Altmann as a permanent collaborator.

In 2005, Thalheimer made his debut as an opera director with Leoš Janáček's Káťa Kabanová at the Staatsoper Unter den Linden, followed in December of the same year by an interpretation of Verdi's Rigoletto.

At Hamburg's Thalia Theater in particular, Thalheimer acquired an excellent reputation as a theatre director with productions of Schiller's Kabale und Liebe, Schnitzler's Liebelei and other classics. He is able to reduce even the most difficult material to its basic content and transport it emotionally and mentally. As a perfectionist, Thalheimer attaches great importance to the facial expressions and gestures of his actors, who sometimes fill minutes of wordless phases, which are then replaced by a flood of text recited in paragraphs and performed in staccato.

After many successful years at Hamburg's Thalia Theater, Thalheimer shifted his work more and more to the Deutsches Theater in Berlin. After he had achieved the greatest success there in years with his two productions of Goethe's Faust I and Faust II, which were acclaimed by critics and audiences alike, he was head director from 2005 to 2008.

His production of Dea Loher's play Innocence became the subject of a protest action in spring 2012.

Berliner Theatertreffen 
 Liliom (Ferenc Molnár) at the Thalia Theater Hamburg, 2000
 Festen (after the film by Thomas Vinterberg) at the Staatsschauspiel Dresden, 2000
 Liebelei (Arthur Schnitzler) at the Thalia Theater Hamburg, 2001
 Lulu (Frank Wedekind) at the Thalia Theater Hamburg, 2005
 Oresteia (Aeschylus) at the Deutschen Theater Berlin, 2007
 Die Ratten (Gerhart Hauptmann) at the Deutschen Theater Berlin, 2007
 Medea (Euripides) at the Schauspiel Frankfurt, 2013

Theatre (as director) 
Schauspiel Frankfurt:
 2012: Medea by Euripides
 2013: Kleiner Mann, was nun? by Hans Fallada
 2014: Nora by Henrik Ibsen
 2015: Penthesilea by Heinrich von Kleist

Burgtheater / Akademietheater:
 2010: Die heilige Johanna der Schlachthöfe by Bertolt Brecht
 2012: Elektra by Hugo von Hofmannsthal
 2014:  by Friedrich Hebbel
 2014: Die Schutzbefohlenen by Elfriede Jelinek
 2017: The Persians by Aeschylus

Awards 
 2001:  im Rahmen des Berliner Theatertreffen for Liliom, Thalia Theater Hamburg (with Olaf Altmann)
  for Emilia Galotti, Deutsches Theater Berlin
 Nestroy Theatre Prize for Emilia Galotti, Deutsches Theater Berlin
 Friedrich-Luft-Preis for Faust. Der Tragödie Erster Teil, Deutsches Theater Berlin
 Nestroy Theatre Prize for Elektra, Burgtheater Wien

References

Further reading 
Hans-Dieter Schütt (ed.): Michael Thalheimer. Porträt eines Regisseurs. Verlag Theater der Zeit, Berlin 2017, .

External links 
 
 Michael Thalheimer: 50 Regisseure im deutschsprachigen Theater. Website of the Goethe-Institut
 

German theatre directors
1965 births
Living people
People from Münster